Madame Tussauds Vienna is a wax museum and tourist attraction located at the famous amusement park Wiener Prater in Vienna, Austria. It was founded by Marie Tussaud and is the eleventh location for the Tussauds franchise. It officially opened on 1 April 2011 by the former Austrian president Heinz Fischer. So far, it features more than 80 figures on three floors. Madame Tussauds is now owned and operated by the United Kingdom-based entertainment company Merlin Entertainments.

Wax figures

Recently introduced figures

Andreas Gabalier 
In May 2017, Madame Tussauds announced through a press conference, that due to popular demand of visitors, Andreas Gabalier, an Austrian folk singer, would be the newest addition to Madame Tussauds in autumn 2017. Over the months, two behind-the-scenes videos of his two sittings in Graz, Austria and London were published to show progress of the wax figure. Gabalier worked closely with the Madame Tussauds team taking over 250 measurements and more than 180 pictures from every angle. This is the first time the star has ever been immortalized in wax by Madame Tussauds. 
He generously donated original tour outfits (Lederhosen, blazer and boots) as well as his accordion.

He was revealed on 5 October 2017 by himself and is standing in an interactive setting in the music section.

Benedict Cumberbatch 
Madame Tussauds teased the arrival of a new wax figure on Facebook in June 2017. The British actor was welcomed with a British tea time-theme party that ran for two weeks. All British wax figures (such as Kate Winslet, Freddie Mercury and Alfred Hitchcock) were standing in the Hollywood Room, visitors were welcomed with a typical London Taxi at the entrance, guards completed this theme party. The figure is sitting on a fauteuil with a royal blue shirt and black blazer. 

The British actor was revealed on 15 June 2017 and is standing in the Hollywood Room/party section.

Sections 
Madame Tussauds Vienna currently consists of more than 80 wax figures. These are divided into the following sections (some of the notable figures are listed):
 History section: Marie Tussaud, Maria Theresia, Marie Antoinette, Napoleon, Leopold Figl, Anne Frank - among others
 Politicians and Visionaries section: Angela Merkel, Barack Obama, Queen Elizabeth II, Dalai Lama, Mahatma Gandhi, Heinz Fischer - among others
 Arts and Culture section: Wolfgang Amadeus Mozart, Ludwig van Beethoven, Luciano Pavarotti, Gustav Klimt, Albert Einstein, Friedensreich Hundertwasser, Sigmund Freud, Gottfried Helnwein - among others
 Sports section: Hermann Maier, Franz Klammer (portrayed as former young skiing athlete), Hans Krankl and Herbert Prohaska (both portrayed as former young soccer players), David Alaba - among others
 Music section: Katy Perry, CRO, Andreas Gabalier, Freddie Mercury, Udo Jürgens, Michael Jackson, Hansi Hinterseer, Elvis Presley - among others
 Film section: Marilyn Monroe, Alfred Hitchcock, Daniel Craig as James Bond, Julie Andrews as Maria von Trapp of The Sound of Music, Brad Pitt, Quentin Tarantino, Romy Schneider - among others
 Hollywood Room/Party section: Justin Bieber, Lady Gaga, Johnny Depp, Rihanna, Conchita Wurst, Sandra Bullock, Kylie Minogue, Kate Winslet, Robert Pattinson, Robbie Williams, Morgan Freeman, Will Smith, George Clooney - among others
 Sisi Uncovered Experience section: Sisi, Franz Joseph I

External links 

 Official website 

Vienna
Museums in Vienna
Museums established in 2011
Tourist attractions in Austria
Operating amusement attractions
Amusement rides introduced in 2011